Massimo Garavaglia (born 8 April 1968) is an Italian politician who served as Minister of Tourism in the Draghi Cabinet.

Biography
Born in Cuggiono in the Province of Milan and resident in Marcallo con Casone, Massimo Garavaglia graduated in Economics from Bocconi University and in Political science from the University of Milan.

He served as mayor of his municipality of residence, Marcallo con Casone, for two terms, from 1999 to 2009.

Garavaglia was elected Deputy for the first time in 2006, among the ranks of the Northern League. In 2008 and 2013 instead he was elected to the Senate. On 19 March 2013 he was appointed Regional Assessor for Economy, Growth and Simplification of the Lombardy Region by Roberto Maroni, so he resigned from the office of Senator on 7 May 2013.

In the 2018 general elections Garavaglia was re-elected to the Chamber of Deputies. On 12 June 2018 he was appointed Undersecretary at the Ministry of Economy in the Conte Government and on 21 March 2019 he was promoted, together with Laura Castelli (M5S), Deputy Minister of Economy.

On 13 October 2015 he was investigated for an auction disturbance in the investigation that led to the arrest of the vice-president of Lombardy Mario Mantovani.

On 12 February 2021 he was appointed Minister for Tourism in the Draghi Cabinet.

References

1968 births
Draghi Cabinet
Living people
People from Cuggiono
20th-century Italian politicians
21st-century Italian politicians
Bocconi University alumni
University of Milan alumni
Lega Nord politicians
Deputies of Legislature XV of Italy
Senators of Legislature XVI of Italy
Senators of Legislature XVII of Italy
Deputies of Legislature XVIII of Italy
Mayors of places in Lombardy